Solo One is an Australian television series made by Crawford Productions for the Seven Network and screened in 1976. There were 13 half-hour episodes.

Synopsis

The series was a spin-off from Crawford's other police show Matlock Police and featured Paul Cronin reprising his role as Sen. Const. Gary Hogan, but tailored for a younger audience.

It was set in the real country town of Emerald in the Dandenong Ranges east of Melbourne and used the town's actual police station.

In the series Hogan sorts out problems for the locals. His call sign is Solo One, hence the series title.

DVD releases 
The complete 13 episodes of this series are available on DVD and were released on 12 September 2017.

References

External links
Solo One at Classic Australian Television
Solo One at Crawford Productions
Solo One at the National Film and Sound Archive

1970s Australian drama television series
1970s Australian crime television series
Seven Network original programming
Television shows set in Victoria (Australia)
1976 Australian television series debuts
1976 Australian television series endings
Television series by Crawford Productions
Australian television spin-offs